Goodbye My Princess or Eastern Palace is a 2019 Chinese television series based on the novel Eastern Palace by Fei Wo Si Cun; starring Chen Xingxu, Peng Xiaoran, and Shawn Wei. It aired on Youku starting February 14, 2019. 
It had a score of 7.5 points on Douban.

Synopsis
Qu Xiaofeng (Peng Xiaoran), the beloved princess of the Western Liang Kingdom, is promised to the Crown Prince of Li Dynasty in a political marriage between the two countries.

Under the deliberate arrangement by Gu Jian (Shawn Wei), fifth prince Li Chengyin (Chen Xingxu) disguises himself as an ordinary tea merchant by the name Gu Xiaowu, and meets Qu Xiaofeng. They fell in love with each other as Li Chengyin tried to gain her trust to infiltrate Dan Chi, the kingdom ruled by Xiaofeng's grandfather, he killed Xiaofeng's grandfather in order to gain war merits to become the new Crown Prince. After discovering the truth behind Li Chengyin's intentions, she jumps down the River of Forgetfulness to forget the painful memories. Li Chengyin, shocked at Xiaofeng's decision, follows suit.

Several months later, Xiaofeng is now married to Li Chengyin, who is now the crown prince of Li Kingdom. 
Although the Crown Prince is the second most powerful person in the kingdom, the Eastern Palace, where he lives, is one of the most dangerous places. Due to all the schemes and betrayals in the Eastern Palace, Xiaofeng and Chengyin's lives begin to intersect and somewhere buried within are hidden memories yet to resurface. Will Xiaofeng find true love during her journey and will she be able to face the cruel world of politics?

Cast

Main

 Chen Xingxu as Li Chengyin / Gu Xiaowu
5th prince of Li Dynasty, later Crown Prince.
 Initially a carefree and innocent man, Li Chengyin turned ambitious and cruel after knowing the truth behind his mother and elder brother's death. He is a cunning and deceptive man who is skilled in maneuvering politics and hiding his true feelings.Despite using Xiaofeng for his political gains, he truly falls in love with her. After losing his memory, he falls in love with her again for the second time but also causes her unbearable pain and anguish.
 Peng Xiaoran as Qu Xiaofeng
9th Princess of Western Liang, later Crown Princess of Li Dynasty. 
 Innocent, naive, kind and bubbly. She falls in love with Gu Xiaowu, but pained by his betrayal and her family's tragedy, she jumps into the River of Forgetfulness to forget about their love. She falls in love with Li Chengyin for the second time, but is unwilling to open up her heart to him as she believes that Li Chengyin loves Zhao Sese.
 Shawn Wei as Gu Jian
Li Chengyin's cousin, Xiaofeng's teacher. 
 The last descendant of the Gu lineage. He has feelings for Xiaofeng, but can never show them as he is tasked with avenging the Gu family's genocide. He was reluctantly forced by his teacher to assist Li Chengyin in using Xiaofeng to eliminate Danchi, and later uses his remaining life to make redemption to Xiaofeng out of guilt and love for her.

Supporting

Li Kingdom

Royal family

 Gallen Lo as Emperor
 Siqin Gaowa as Empress Dowager
 Zhang Dinghan as Zhang Meiniang
Empress of Li.
 Gao Yihan as Gao Ruyi
 Royal Consort Gao. Daughter of Gao Yuming.
 Wang Jiaqi as Gu Yuyao 
 Consort Shu. 
Li Chengyin's deceased birth mother and Gu Jian's aunt. She was the Emperor's most beloved woman.
 Zhang Tong as Wei Xiuyi
 Consort Wei. Li Chengmei's birth mother.
 Dong Xian as Consort De
 Yao Anlian as Prince Zhong
 Brother of the Emperor.
 Kristy Yang as Princess Mingyuan
 Younger sister of the Empress. Consort of Qu Wencheng. 
She dotes on Li Chengyin, and is the one who revealed the truth of his mother's death to him.
 Zhang Aoyue as Li Chengji
 Crown prince. He was killed in a planned attack by Li Chengye.
 Kingone Wang as Li Chengye
 Second prince (Prince Xuande). A cruel and power-hungry man who killed Li Chengji and attempted to assassinate the Emperor in order to attain the throne.
 Yang Tong as Li Chengmei
 Third prince (Prince Rong).
 Jin Xuanyu as Li Chengyuan
 Fourth prince (Prince Yun).
 Xia Wa as Zhao Sese
 Daughter of Zhao Jingyu. Consort of Li Chengyin.
A cunning and deceptive woman, who hides behind an innocent and weak facade. She loves Li Chengyin and tries to sabotage both Xiaofeng and Xu Baolin many times. She later becomes insane after Li Chengyin tells her that he never loved her and was only using her. 
 Cheng Xiaomeng as Yong Ning
 Seventh princess. One of Xiaofeng's best friends in the palace.
 Chen Jinru as Luo Xi
 Eight princess. She was in love with Pei Zhao since she was young, and later marries him. One of Xiaofeng's best friends in the palace.

Officials and generals

 Wang Zhifei as Gao Yuming
 Prime minister.  He is at odds with the Emperor, and attempts to control Li Chengyin to secure his position at court.
 Wang Guan as Pei Zhao
 Commander of Yulin Army. Loyal subordinate of Li Chengyin. Son of Elder Princess Pingnan. Luo Xi's husband. He feels guilty toward Xiaofeng, and showers her with extra kindness and protection in the palace.
 Fan Linfeng as Li Yan, son of Prince Zhong. Loyal subordinate of Li Chengye.
 Lu Xing as Gao Xian, Dingyuan general. First son of Gao Yuming.
 Yu Bin as Gao Kun, Minister of Revenue. Second son of Gao Yuming.
 Feng Xiaotong as Gao Zhen
 Assistant minister. Third son of Gao Yuming. A playboy and gambler. He was exposed for his crimes and killed in a planned attack by his rival, Zhao Shixuan.
 Zhao Tao as Zhao Jingyu, Duke of Zhenbei. Zhao Sese's father.
 Zhu Zanjin as Zhao Shixuan, assistant minister. Son of Zhao Jingyu, Zhao Sese's brother.
 Wang Han as Zeng Xian, commander of Shen Wu army.
 Li Jianxin as Ye Cheng, grand secretary.
 Cheng Guodong as Xi Qingzhuo, Minister of Rites.
 Wang Huan as Gu Ruhui, former Minister. Gu Jian's father. He was falsely accused and killed by Gao Yuming.
 Han Jinghuo as Zhang Can
 Left commander of the Left Yulin Army. Nephew of the Empress. Subordinate of Pei Zhao. He was killed by Gao Zhen.
 Shen Baoping as Wang Shu, officer of Dali Temple.
 Han Xuanlong as Scholar Li, teacher of Li Chengyin.
 Shen Xuewei as Scholar Fang, teacher of Li Chengyin. He was tasked to watch over Li Chengyin by Gao Yuming.
 Fan Shende as Minister An, he was killed by Gao Xian while protecting Xiaofeng from being taken away.
 Fan Jinlun as Yuan Tong, Gao Xian's subordinate.
 Wang Yueyao as Leng Kun, Li Yan's subordinate. He took on Batu'er's identity and admitted to killing the Crown prince.

Servants

 Jiang Changyi as Cao Jiu, head eunuch. Personal attendant of the Emperor.
 Gao Yuan as Shi En, personal attendant of Li Chengyin.
 Gu Jia as Yong Niang
 Personal attendant of Xiao Feng. She was sent to serve Xiao Feng by the Empress Dowager, and does her best to assist/protect Xiao Feng.
 Wang Tongyu as Rong Shuang
 Personal attendant of the Empress. She is extremely loyal to the Empress, and attempts to assassinate Li Chengyin for her.
 Li Wenlong as Wei Shen, personal attendant of the Empress.
 Yu Han as Xu Niang 
 A maid under the Empress, who was pregnant with Zhang Can's child. She was instructed by the Empress to lie that the child belonged to Li Chengyin, and became his consort (baolin). She was later secretly sent out of the palace by Li Chengyin.
 Li Na as Ying'er
 A maid under the Empress. She was instructed by the Empress to spy on Li Chengyin in the Eastern palace.
 Shang Siqi as Chan'er
 A maid under Li Chengye. She was sent to serve Li Chengyin and framed him for poisoning Xiao Feng. She was later killed by the Emperor in order to protect Li Chengye.
 Gao Xirui as Jin'er
Personal attendant of Zhao Sese.
 Shen Xuewei as Fang Shangyi
Etiquette teacher who was responsible for teaching Xiao Feng.
 Zhu Xinfang as Physician Wang

Others

 Shao Feng as Chai Mu
 Leader of Pugilistic organization, Qian Long Order. He is actually Chen Zheng, an officer of Li kingdom who was falsely accused and evicted by Gao Yuming. He was later killed by the Emperor.
 Wei Xiaohan as Ming Yue
 A famous courtesan at Ming Yu brothel. She is actually Chen Yan, daughter of Chen Zheng. Gu Jian's childhood friend, and one of Xiao Feng's best friends. She later became a consort of the Emperor to seek revenge for her family, and committed suicide after her father's death.
 Guan Le as Mi Luo
 Owner of Mi Luo Wine House. One of Xiao Feng's best friends. She is secretly in love with Pei Zhao.
 Zhao Renjie as Hu Xiao, Chai Mu's subordinate.
 Lu Keke as Tao Jian, member of Qian Long order.
 Guo Junke as Sun Er, An assassin under Li Chengyin.
 Zhuang Qingning as Madame Peiguo, Mother of the Empress.
 Han Ying as Madame Zhang, Zhang Can's mother.
 Wei Yiyi as Xiao Wei, shopkeeper of the cosmetics and clothing store Wei Pin Ge.
 Xu Min as Mother Wang, owner of Ming Yu brothel.

Western State

Western State Palace

 Jiang Kai as Qu Wencheng
 King of Western State. Xiao Feng's father. He goes crazy after he witnessed his wife committing suicide in front of him.
 Tian Ling as Ashina Yun
 Queen of Western State. Daughter of King Tömür. Xiao Feng's mother. 
She was reluctant to marry off Xiao Feng to the Central Plains, and sends her off to Danchi to prevent it. In the end, she was forced to commit suicide by Gao Xian. 
 Hu Chunyong as Qu Tianze, prince of Western State. Xiao Feng's brother.
 Li Mingde as Di Mo, personal attendant of the Queen.
 Fang Shuai as Lahemeng, Minister of Relations.
 Zhao Zhengang as Witch Doctor

Danchi

 Zhang Xiaoning as King Tömür 
 King of Dan Chi. Xiao Feng's grandfather. He was beheaded by Li Chengyin, in the war between Li Kingdom and Danchi.
 Zhang Ge as Yi Moyan
 Grandson of King Tomur.  Xiao Feng's cousin. He died in the war between Li Kingdom and Danchi.
 Zhang Hengrui as He Shi
 Great warrior of Dan Chi. Ah Du's brother. He died in the war between Li Kingdom and Danchi.
 Najima as Ah Du
 Xiao Feng's best friend and loyal servant. 
She pretends to be a mute in order to stay by Xiaofeng's side. She was killed by Gao Xian after assassinating Gao Xiao.
 Tian Xinyu as Batu'er
 A man from Danchi who was framed for killing the Crown Prince. He was later killed by Li Yan on their journey to the Central Plains and replaced by Li Yan's subordinate to make it seem like Danchi was responsible for the death of the Crown prince.

Shuo Bo

 Hao Wenxue as King
 Zhao Longhao as Prince Lidun
 Nephew of the King. He colludes with Li Chengyin to eliminate Danchi.
 Chen Tao as Yuan Ge, general.

Production
The drama was filmed from August 2017 to February 2018. Filming also took place in Beijing, Bashang Grassland, Dunhuang and Hengdian World Studios.

The series reportedly has a production budget of 200 million yuan.

Reception
The drama has earned positive reviews since its premiere, due to the outstanding performance of the cast, beautiful costumes and fitting props; as well as high-quality cinematography.
The writing of the adaptation was also praised for staying true to the classic scenes within the novel, while adding in additional scenes that fleshed out the details of the novel and allowing the plot to unfold steadily.

Soundtrack

Awards and nominations

International Broadcast 
 
 
  - TTV11 May 22, 2019

References

https://www.tvmao.com/drama/LTAdL2Q=/episode/2-9. tvmao(in Chinese).January 18, 2023

External links
 Goodbye My Princess on Sina Weibo

2019 Chinese television series debuts
Chinese historical television series
Chinese romance television series
2019 Chinese television series endings
Television shows based on works by Fei Wo Si Cun
Youku original programming
Chinese web series
2019 web series debuts
Television series by Hualu Baina Film & TV